Louis Peter Boitard (fl. 1750) was a French engraver and designer, who worked in London.

Life
He was born in France, and was a pupil of Raymond Lafage. His father François Boitard brought him to England. The date of Louis Boitard's death is unknown, being stated by some authorities as 1758, by others as after 1760. The earlier date seems much more likely if  he was indeed buried in 1758.

Louis Boitard was buried 30th September 1758 in the church of St Martin-in-the-Fields, London.

Works
He made engravings after Canaletto, Christophe Huet, Giovanni Paolo Pannini, and others. One of his best-known plates represents the Rotunda at Ranelagh Gardens, after Pannini. In 1747 he supplied forty-one large plates for Joseph Spence's Polymetis. He engraved the illustrations to John Gilbert Cooper's Life of Socrates (1749), Robert Paltock's The Life and Adventures of Peter Wilkins, a Cornish Man (1750), and Richard Owen Cambridge's Scribleriad (1751).

He executed many vignettes, designs, and portraits, among those one of Elizabeth Canning; and he is said to have been a humorist and a member of the Artists' Club.

Family
His wife was English; and he had a son of the same name and profession.

Notes

Attribution

References

External links
British Museum page
Royal Academy page

Year of birth unknown
Year of death unknown
18th-century French engravers